is a Prefectural Natural Park in northern Tokushima Prefecture, Japan.

See also
 National Parks of Japan

References

Parks and gardens in Tokushima Prefecture
Protected areas established in 2005
2005 establishments in Japan
Awa, Tokushima
Yoshinogawa, Tokushima